Macunahyphes is a genus of little stout crawler mayflies in the family Leptohyphidae. There are about six described species in Macunahyphes.

Species
These six species belong to the genus Macunahyphes:
 Macunahyphes araca Souto & Salles, 2016
 Macunahyphes australis (Banks, 1913)
 Macunahyphes eduardoi Almeida & Mariano, 2015
 Macunahyphes incognitus Molineri, Grillet, Nieto, Domínguez & Guerrero, 2011
 Macunahyphes pemonensis Molineri, Grillet, Nieto, Domínguez & Guerrero, 2011
 Macunahyphes zagaia Souto & Salles, 2016

References

Further reading

 
 

Mayflies
Articles created by Qbugbot